Woodside Viaduct was a railway bridge in Halifax, West Yorkshire, England. It had six arches and was situated between Woodside (Old Lane) Tunnel and Lee Bank Tunnel. The bridge carried the Queensbury to Halifax section of the Queensbury lines.

The viaduct was demolished to make room for the dual carriageway on the A629 road, the main road between Halifax and Keighley.

References

Buildings and structures in Halifax, West Yorkshire
Railway viaducts in West Yorkshire
Demolished bridges in England